Mount Allison University (also Mount A or MtA) is a Canadian primarily undergraduate liberal arts university located in Sackville, New Brunswick, founded in 1839.  

Like other liberal arts schools in North America, Mount Allison does not participate in rankings primarily based on research, such as QS. However, it has been ranked the top undergraduate university in the country 23 times in the past 32 years by Maclean's magazine, a record unmatched by any other university.  With a 15.7 student-to-faculty ratio, the average first-year class size is 60 and upper-year classes average 14 students.

Mount Allison was the first university in the British Empire to award a baccalaureate to a woman (Grace Annie Lockhart, B.Sc., 1875). Graduates of Mount Allison have been awarded a total of 56 Rhodes Scholarships, the highest per capita of any university in the British Commonwealth.

Among universities in Canada, Mount Allison is one of the wealthiest on an endowment per student basis. Of the 69 universities reporting on endowment funds nationally, Mount Allison has the largest endowment fund per student in Canada (when small residential colleges federated with larger universities are excluded).

History 
Mount Allison University is a secular (but United Church-affiliated) primarily undergraduate liberal arts university, established at Sackville, New Brunswick on January 19, 1843. The university was named after Charles Frederick Allison, in honour of his gift of land and money. Its origins were steeped in the Methodist faith and it was designed to prepare men for the ministry and to supply education for lay members. The university was chartered on April 14, 1849.

In June 1839, Charles Allison was encouraged by Wesleyan Methodist Minister Rev. John Bass Strong that a school of elementary and higher learning be built. Allison offered to purchase a site in Sackville to erect a suitable building for an academy and to contribute operating funds of £100 a year for 10 years. This offer was accepted and the Wesleyan Academy for boys subsequently opened in 1843.

In 1854, a girls' institution (later known as the "Ladies College") was opened to complement the boys' academy. In 1858 an Act of the New Brunswick Legislature authorized the trustees to establish a degree-conferring institution at Sackville, under the name of the Mount Allison Wesleyan College.

In July 1862, the degree-granting Mount Allison College was organized. The first two students, Howard Sprague and Josiah Wood, graduated in May 1863. Mount Allison was the first university in the British Empire to confer a bachelor's degree to a woman (Grace Annie Lockhart, B.Sc. 1875). It was also the first university in Canada to grant a bachelor of arts to a woman (Harriet Starr Stewart). For nearly a century, Mount Allison functioned as three distinct, mutually enriching parts: the college proper, the Boys' Academy, and the Ladies College. The corporate name was changed to University of Mount Allison College in 1886.

The university's affiliation was transferred to the United Church of Canada following church union in 1925. Original components of the university included: the Mount Allison Wesleyan Academy for Boys (1840–1958), the Ladies' College (1854–1958), and Mount Allison College. Mount Allison College was established in 1862 with degree-granting powers on behalf of the other two.

The governance was modelled on the provincial University of Toronto Act of 1906 which established a bicameral system of university government consisting of a senate (faculty), responsible for academic policy, and a board of governors (citizens) exercising exclusive control over financial policy and having formal authority in all other matters. The president, appointed by the board, was to provide a link between the two bodies and to perform institutional leadership.

American chemist James B. Sumner, who won the 1946 Nobel Prize in Chemistry, taught at Mount Allison as a teaching fellow beginning in 1910.

By 1920, Mount Allison University had three faculties: Arts, Theology, and Engineering. It awarded the degrees of Bachelor of Arts (BA), Bachelor of Science (BSc), Bachelor of Divinity (BD), and Master of Arts. It had 246 male students and 73 female students, as well as 28 academic staff, all male.

The closure of the School for Girls in 1946 and the Boy's Academy in 1953 coincided with a period of expansion and provided much-needed space for the growing university. In 1958, a period of construction and acquisition of buildings began, easing the strain of overcrowding at the institution. At this time the university board and administration decided to reaffirm the traditional aims of Mount Allison in providing a high-quality undergraduate liberal arts education, along with continuing to offer professional programs in already-established fields. As such, the university decided not to compete for new professional programs and generally avoided post-graduate course development.

The policy of university education initiated in the 1960s responded to population pressure and the belief that higher education was a key to social justice and economic productivity for individuals and for society. Mount Allison University was established by the Mount Allison University Act, 1993.

Mount Allison University's arms and badge were registered with the Canadian Heraldic Authority on November 15, 2007.

Academics 
The mission statement of Mount Allison University promotes "the creation and dissemination of knowledge in a community of higher learning, centred on the undergraduate student and delivered in an intimate and harmonious environment". Mount Allison currently offers bachelor's degrees in arts, science, commerce, fine arts, and music, as well as master's degrees in biology and chemistry and biochemistry, and certificates in bilingualism. A Bachelor's degree in Science or Commerce with a major in Aviation has been developed in conjunction with the Moncton Flight College.

Mount Allison has the best record of Rhodes Scholars per capita in the British Commonwealth  — 56 all together, and 15 in the past 16 years.

In 2014, 76% of the student body received an entrance scholarship.

The university's enrolment was 2,288 full-time students plus 91 part-time students in Fall 2021.

Faculties, departments, and programs 

 Faculty of Arts (BA, BMus, BFA, minor)
 American Studies
 Art History
 Canadian Studies
 Classics
 Computer Science & Music
 Drama
 French Studies 
 English
 Pierre Lassonde School of Fine Arts
 German Studies
 History
 Hispanic Studies
 Indigenous Studies
 Japanese Studies
 Language and the Mind
 Modern Languages & Literatures
 Museum & Curatorial Studies 
 Music
 Philosophy
 Psychology
 Religious Studies
 Screen Studies & Popular Culture 
Visual and Material Culture Studies
Women & Gender Studies
 Faculty of Social Sciences (BA, BComm, minor)
Anthropology
 Aviation (in conjunction with Moncton Flight College)
 Commerce
 Economics
 Geography & Environment Studies
 Politics & International Relations
Public Policy
 Sociology
 Environmental Studies
 Frank McKenna School of Philosophy, Politics, & Economics
 Faculty of Science (BSc, BASc, MSc, minor)
 Applied Physics
 Astronomy
 Aviation (in conjunction with Moncton Flight College)
 Biology
 Biopsychology
 Chemistry & Biochemistry
 Cognitive Science
 Data Science
 Environmental Science
 Geocomputing
 Interdisciplinary Health Studies
 Mathematics & Computer Science
 Physics
 Psychology

Architecture 

Mount Allison's architecture is one of the campus's defining features.

In most cases, the present campus is much newer than the age of the institution, which was founded in the mid-19th century. At that time, the original Mount Allison buildings were wooden clapboarded structures all painted white. Succumbing to fires or demolition, these earlier buildings have been replaced with brick or stone structures, although a unique and significant instance of early Mount Allison wooden architecture survives at the centre of campus: the President's Cottage of 1857.

Noted architectural historian, John Leroux, who is working with visual artist Thaddeus Holownia on a book about the university's architecture, calls the campus "one of the finest in Canada"  and says some of the most beautiful buildings built in New Brunswick in the last 100 years are located at Mount Allison.

In particular, Leroux names the Mount Allison chapel as one of the most significant buildings in the province, saying, "It is exquisite. It is nearly a perfect building." The chapel is a masterwork of the Ontario-based architecture firm of Brown, Brisley and Brown, who designed numerous new buildings and transformed the site configuration of Mount Allison in the mid- to late-1960s and early 1970s into the landscape it is today. Paramount of their scheme was the creation of the central courtyard with the chapel as a focus at one end, and the Library's gateway colonnade overlooking the town and Convocation Hall at the other. Among the other Brown, Brisley and Brown buildings completed at Mount Allison between 1964 and 1980 are: the Gairdner Fine Arts Building, the Marjorie Young Bell Conservatory of Music, the Barclay Chemistry Building, Edwards House, Thornton House, the Ralph Pickard Bell Library, and the Harold Crabtree Building.

 Other significant buildings are the Owens Art Gallery, the oldest university art gallery in Canada, which opened in 1895, and Hammond House, the only registered National Historic Site in the Town of Sackville. Both were designed by noted Toronto architect Edmund Burke. The Queen Anne Revival-style Hammond House was originally built for Canadian artist and head of the Fine Arts department John Hammond in 1896. It now serves as the President's residence.

Several campus buildings were designed by architect Andrew R. Cobb, including the Memorial Library (1926–27; demol. 2011), Flemington Building (1930–31), and Centennial Hall (1883–84, but redesigned by Cobb in 1933 after the original was gutted by fire).

The Memorial Library (renamed University Centre in 1970) was constructed in the Tudor-inspired Gothic Revival style. The library also included a set of plaques, now located on the ground floor atrium of the Wallace McCain Student Centre, which are listed in the Canadian Forces' National Inventory of Canadian Military Memorials – No. 13002-004. The plaques list the names of Allisonians who lost their lives at war. Every year since 1927, the names of each of the fallen are read aloud during the university's annual Remembrance Day service.

The Wallace McCain Student Centre, originally constructed as a men's residence (Trueman House) in 1945 and designed by Halifax architect C.A. Fowler, was gutted and repurposed in 2008, keeping the exterior form and stone walls intact.

The newest building on campus is the Purdy Crawford Centre for the Arts, which opened in 2014. Housing the Pierre Lassonde School of Fine Arts and the department of drama, the building features art studios, a large atrium, and the 100-seat Motyer-Fancy Theatre. Designed by the internationally honoured Canadian architecture firm Zeidler Partnership, it was featured in Canadian Architect magazine in March 2015.

Housing 

Mount Allison has housing facilities available for approximately 50 percent of its student population. More than 85 percent of first-year students choose to live in residence. On-campus accommodations are guaranteed to all first-year students who meet admission and deposit deadlines. All rooms come with high speed wired as well as wireless Internet, as well as cable, phone, and mini fridge.

All buildings are co-ed with wing to wing or integrated bathrooms. Sixty percent of rooms are either single or ensuite style and 40 percent are double accommodation. Campbell Hall, winner of CBIP Award for incorporation of environment features, offers large single rooms with ensuite bathrooms. 

The following residences are open for new and returning students:
 Campbell Hall
 Harper Hall (Harper is closed for renovations, re-opening to students in September 2024)
 Windsor Hall
 Bigelow House
 Bennett House
 Hunton House
 Thornton House
 Edwards House

In addition, Mount Allison also offers senior students a chance to live in several small residences including:

 Carriage House (11 residents, co-ed)
 The Anchorage (21 residents, co-ed)
 Bermuda House (34 residents, co-ed)
 Charlotte House (27 residents, co-ed)

Social life 

Social life at Mount Allison tends to focus on extracurricular activities: there are 140 clubs and societies and over 30 varsity, club, and intramural sports teams.

Mount Allison students also socialize at places like Gracie's, The Pond (campus pub), Ducky's, Joey's, and the Bridge Street Café.

Mount Allison's campus paper, The Argosy, is an independent publication produced weekly. The publication dates from 1872, making it one of the oldest student publications in the country. The campus and community radio station, CHMA 106.9 FM, is owned and operated by the members of Attic Broadcasting Company Ltd., a non-profit organization with its offices on the university campus.

Tintamarre theatre company was founded at Mount Allison by Professor Alex Fancy and produces a bilingual collective show each year, staged at the Motyer-Fancy Theatre and later presented at junior and senior high schools throughout the Maritime provinces. A performing arts series is held at Convocation Hall (one of the largest concert halls east of Montreal) during the school year, and the annual President's Speakers Series  brings nationally and internationally renowned speakers to campus each year.

Fine Art students run START Gallery within Struts Gallery, a CARFAC artist-run center.

Student government 

The Mount Allison Students’ Union (MASU) represents all full- and part-time students at Mount Allison. It operates as a membership-based non-profit corporation and was incorporated in 1980 under the New Brunswick Companies Act.

Administration 

Mount Allison University 107726820RR0001 was registered as a charitable organization in Canada on January 1, 1967. The primary areas in which the charity is now carrying on programs to achieve its charitable purposes, ranked according to the percentage of time and resources devoted to each program area follow:

 Universities and colleges 97%
 Scholarships, bursaries, awards 3%

The charity carried on charitable programs to further its charitable purpose(s) (as defined in its governing documents) this fiscal period:

 Provides rigorous liberal education primarily to undergraduate students in a co-educational intimate residential environment.
 Provides scholarships, bursaries and awards to students.

Notable alumni

Athletics 

The school's team name in Canadian Interuniversity Sport (CIS) is the Mount Allison Mounties. The football team has appeared in the Vanier Cup national college football championship game twice (1984 & 1991). The Mount Allison football team also made playoff appearances in 2007, 2008, 2010, 2013, and 2014. The team won the 2013 AUS championship, but lost to the Laval Rouge et Or in the Uteck Bowl (the national college football semi final) and in 2014, losing to McMaster in the Mitchell Bowl.

Mount Allison is also home to a CIS-level women's hockey team, as well as swim, badminton, and soccer teams. Basketball and volleyball teams compete against colleges and other smaller universities.

Mount Allison is the winner of the first ever ACAA men's rugby championship in 2007 and remained undefeated through 2010, resulting in four consecutive championships. In both 2008 and 2009, the men's and women's Mounties remained undefeated throughout the regular season and became ACAA champions. The university women's hockey team plays at the Tantramar Civic Centre.

Labour relations 
Mount Allison faculty are represented by the Mount Allison Faculty Association, and the staff by CUPE 3433 and CUPE 2338. Mount Allison had a three-week long faculty strike in early 2014. Students sought a refund for tuition following the strike, a request that was denied by the Board of Regents. Mount Allison had another week long faculty strike in early 2020, lasting from 03/02/2020 until 08/02/2020.

Arms

See also 
 Higher education in New Brunswick
 List of universities in New Brunswick
 Canadian Interuniversity Sport
 Canadian government scientific research organizations
 Canadian university scientific research organizations
 Canadian industrial research and development organizations

References

Further reading 
 Marie Hammond Callaghan, Ed. 'We Were Here: Women's History at Mount Allison University' (Sackville: © Mount Allison University Press, 2006);
 J. W. Falconer and W. G. Watson 'A Brief History of Pine Hill Divinity Hall and the Theological Department of Mount Allison University' (Halifax: Pine Hill Divinity Hall, 1946 Pamphlet)
 John G. Reid, 'Mount Allison University: A History to 1963' (Toronto: University of Toronto Press, 1984);
 John G. Reid, 'The Mount Allison Ladies College: A Short History, 1984. (Toronto: University of Toronto Press, 1984);

External links 
 
 University Website

 
1839 establishments in New Brunswick
Buildings and structures in Westmorland County, New Brunswick
Educational institutions established in 1839
Education in Westmorland County, New Brunswick
Liberal arts colleges
Sackville, New Brunswick
Maple League